Dimitrie Alexandresco (variant spelling of last name: Alexandrescu; 4 October 1850 in Iaşi – 1925) was a Romanian encyclopedist. The Center for Institutional Analysis and Development in Bucharest offers a scholarship honoring him. The Dimitrie Alexandresco Scholarship is designed for Law School Graduates and students of The National Institute of Magistracy.

References

Romanian encyclopedists
Writers from Iași
1850 births
1925 deaths